Gordon Timothy Bray AM (born 23 June 1949) is an Australian sports commentator and sports journalist. He is colloquially known as "The Voice of Rugby".

Early life
Brought up in the Sydney suburb of Canada Bay and educated at Homebush Boys High School, Bray was a talented schoolboy rugby union footballer representing NSW Combined High Schools and subsequently Eastern Suburbs. While not pursuing a full-time career in rugby, he subsequently made cameo appearances at several tournaments, including the Ettamogah Pub Sevens competition in Albury, the Hong Kong Tens and the World Classics in Bermuda.

Career
Bray's broadcasting career began in 1969 with ABC Sport in Sydney. He spent 25 years commentating for the ABC in Sydney and Hobart, then 16 months at the Network Ten followed by 16 years at the Seven Network. He has also worked for Fox Sports. Bray has commentated at nine Olympic Games, five Commonwealth Games, and nearly 400 rugby internationals, including all nine Rugby World Cups.

In April 2013, Bray joined Network Ten as its chief rugby commentator, after Ten acquired the rugby free-to-air broadcast rights for three years, starting 2013.

Bray has written six books on rugby, including best sellers 'The Australian Rugby Companion' and 'From the Ruck'.

He is an active public speaker and master of ceremonies and also provides media training and mentoring.

In 2022, Bray provided a voice cameo for an episode of children's show Bluey, entitled "The Decider", in which he voiced himself commentating a fictional rugby game between Australia and New Zealand.

Honours and awards
In 2000 Gordon Bray was awarded an Australian Sports Medal for his services to rugby through refereeing and for being a long time supporter via television broadcasting.

In the June 2005 Queen's Birthday Honours List he was made a Member of the Order of Australia "For service to broadcasting as a sports commentator, to the promotion of Rugby Union football, and to the community".

He is also a past recipient of the prestigious Penguin Award for sports broadcasting.

In 1999 Gordon had a street named after him in Lidcombe NSW: Gordon Bray Circuit.

Community work
Bray is an ambassador for Legacy Australia, a charity which supports war widows and their families. Legacy supported Gordon as a child after he lost his parents at an early age.

In 2012, Bray was an Australia Day Ambassador in NSW.

References

Australian sportswriters
Members of the Order of Australia
1949 births
Living people
Australian rugby union commentators